Iraivi is a 2016 Indian Tamil-language crime drama film written and directed by Karthik Subbaraj and produced by C. V. Kumar, K. E. Gnanavel Raja and Abinesh Elangovan under their banners Thirukumaran Entertainment, Studio Green and Abi & Abi Pictures, respectively. The film features an ensemble cast with S. J. Surya, Vijay Sethupathi, Bobby Simha, Kamalinee Mukherjee, Anjali, and Pooja Devariya playing leading roles. The plot revolves around three financially struggling men try to overcome their problems, by getting involved in criminal activities though not realising the impact their efforts are having on the women in their lives.

Karthik Subbaraj drafted the script during the production works of Jigarthanda in September 2013 and took more than a year for its completion. The film was formally announced in September 2014, with principal shooting of the film began in May 2015 and filming completed that September. The film is based on a real life incident from a Christian family, though Subbaraj gave importance to the women characters, so as to influence their characters in the society. The film features music composed by Santhosh Narayanan with cinematography handled by Sivakumar Vijayan and edited by Vivek Harshan.

Iraivi released on 3 June 2016, and received mixed to positive reviews. Critics lauded the performances of the cast, particularly that of SJ Surya and Anjali alongside the technical aspects of the film. However the film did average collections at the box office. In 2017, Anjali was nominated for the Best Actress award at the 2nd IIFA Utsavam awards, and Pooja Devariya received a nomination for Best Supporting Actress award at the 6th South Indian International Movie Awards.

Plot
The film centers around three men and the women in their life: a struggling and alcoholic film director Arul (S. J. Surya) and his wife Yazhini (Kamalinee Mukherjee); Arul's best friend Michael (Vijay Sethupathi) and his wife Ponni (Anjali); and Arul's younger brother Jagan (Bobby Simha).

Arul was a renowned film director until he fell out with the producer of his latest directorial film, because of which the film never released. To overcome his sorrow, he became a chronic alcoholic and started harassing Yazhini. Though Yazhini often threatens to divorce Arul for his behavior, she changes her mind each time due to her love for him.

Michael, an artifact dealer, is forced to marry Ponni, despite being in love with a widow named Malar (Pooja Devariya). However, Malar has no love for Michael, merely considering their relationship as friends with benefits. Michael openly reveals to Ponni that he is not interested in being her husband and ignores her.

Yazhini tries to convince Arul to seek the producer's forgiveness and get his film released so that they both could return to a normal life. When Arul refuses, the producer himself steps in and asks Arul to pay him 4,00,00,000 to get his film released. Michael and Jagan, with the help of their friend Ramesh (Karunakaran), steal a temple idol and sell it for 4,00,00,000 so that Arul's film can be released. Unfortunately, the producer has already decided to remake Arul's film with an entirely new cast and with his own brother as the director. Arul confronts the producer, who tries to kill him. In a fit of rage, Michael bludgeons the producer to death and is soon sentenced to seven years' imprisonment for his crime. An angry Ponni starts ignoring her husband, never visits him in jail, gives birth to their daughter, and eventually returns to her village. Meanwhile, Yazhini returns to her parents' house and files for a divorce against Arul, fed up of his alcoholism.

Arul is sent to rehab to overcome his alcoholism and is released two years later. Now sober, Arul tries to convince Yazhini to return to him, to no avail. Meanwhile, Arul and Jagan bail out Michael, who leaves for Ponni's village in an attempt to restart his married life with her. Ponni agrees to come back with him on the condition that he breaks his friendship with Arul. The deceased producer's widow and brother meet with Arul and decide to sell the production rights of his film to him for 20,00,000. In order to get the money, Michael and Jagan again team up with Ramesh to steal an idol from a Kerala temple and sell it. However, Ramesh drugs Michael and runs away with the idol. Michael is arrested the following morning, but he manages to escape from the police and return to Chennai.

On confronting Ramesh, he finds out that Jagan was responsible for getting him arrested at Kerala. Jagan was also in love with Ponni and was disgusted at the way Michael treated her. When Michael was in jail, Jagan declared his love for Ponni, who reciprocated but was forced to return to her village the next day as she was unable to decide between Michael and Jagan. Jagan then decided to get Michael arrested so that Ponni could leave Michael for good and start a new life with him. After confronting Ponni over her love for Jagan, both Michael and she decide to forget everything that happened and plan to leave Chennai to start a new life.

Arul, who has successfully acquired the production rights for his film, decides to once again convince Yazhini to return to him. Yazhini, who is getting engaged to another person, Vasanth (Vaibhav), forgives him and agrees to return to him as long as Vasanth agrees. Meanwhile, Michael picks up a fight with a drunk Jagan over Ponni. During the fight, he accidentally kills Jagan, forcing him and Ponni to go into hiding, but he does not tell her that he killed Jagan. When the train that Michael and Ponni are travelling in stops at Palur, Arul, who has found out that Michael had killed his brother, notices him and shoots him in revenge. As Arul is taken to prison, he contacts Yazhini and pretends that he has once again returned to his drunken habits as he does not want her to suffer with the stigma of being a criminal's wife, effectively ending their relationship.

In the end, with their respective husbands out of the way, Ponni and Yazhini relish their newly found freedom by enjoying the rain. Yazhini only watches the rain, leaving the viewers to introspect on how she is not ready to venture out into the world alone yet, while Ponni allows herself to get drenched, finally letting go.

Cast

Production

Development 
Karthik Subbaraj began writing for his untitled third project before the completion of Jigarthanda in September 2013, but the launch of the film has been pushed ahead due to the delay in Jigarthandas release. In September 2014, few reports claimed that the film will be titled as Iraivi and will be produced by C. V. Kumar's Thirukumaran Entertainment banner, but Karthik Subbaraj said that "The reports are not true. We also did not finalize the script work of the film. We have zeroed in few titles and Iraivi is also one among those. But it's not yet concluded." In October 2014, Thirukumaran Entertainment officially confirmed the project with Gavemic U. Ary who worked with Subbaraj in Jigarthanda, and Santhosh Narayanan, who earlier collaborated with the director in his previous movies has been roped in to compose music. But the former was replaced by Sivakumar Vijayan during the start of the shoot.

During August 2015, Subbaraj revealed that the title 'Iraivi' is the feminine word for 'Iraivan' which means God. He added that "The film is women-centric. But the plot of the story also revolves around the relationship between two brothers, which is based on a real incident from a Christian family. We added importance to the female characters, to state that how women in this day and age influence the society. The story also has a crime angle, but we cannot reveal the discussions further." In a May 2016 interview with Vishal Menon for The Hindu, Subbaraj stated that the works of K. Balachander, Balu Mahendra and J. Mahendran, whose films being women-centric had inspired him to do the film and stated that their works will be credited during the beginning of the film.

Casting 
Subbaraj revealed the casting process of the film during November 2014 that Bobby Simha and Karunakaran had bagged one of the roles in the film, followed by Vijay Sethupathi. S. J. Surya had also confirmed being a part of the cast in February 2015, and was reported to play a character with negative shades. In April 2015, the film crew held discussions for the female lead roles with actresses Pooja Devariya and Anjali considered, with the latter later signed on. Pooja Kumar was also reported to play a pivotal role in the film, but she was replaced by Kamalinee Mukherjee in June 2015, though she did not divulge details about her role. In a press interaction during August 2015, Karthik Subbaraj stated that the film will be centred on how women influence men in today's society and has a lot of scope for the heroines.

Filming 
The film had an official launch on 20 May 2015 and principal shooting began the very same day. Scenes featuring Bobby Simha and S. J. Surya were shot first during the schedule. In July 2015, Vijay Sethupathi and Anjali began shooting for their portions at Chennai. Filming silently progressed with 80% of sequences being completed as of 2 September 2015; few scenes were shot in Wayanad apart from major portions being set in Chennai. Anjali completed shooting her portions in mid-September 2015. On 30 September 2015, it was announced that shooting of the film has been completed and the team also began post-production works. Dubbing works of the film began in November 2015.

Soundtrack

The soundtrack album is composed by Santhosh Narayanan, who earlier collaborated with Karthik Subbaraj in his previous movies, Pizza and Jigarthanda. The album features six tracks with lyrics written by Vivek, Muthamil and Mani Amudhavan. On the occasion of Women's Day (8 March 2016), Santhosh recorded a powerful song dedicated to women, with his mother Mahalakshmi Rajagopalan rendered vocals for the song. The film's audio tracklist revealed on the occasion of Tamil New Year's Day (14 April 2016) and the following day, 15 April 2016, the makers revealed the entire soundtrack album at a promotional event held with the presence of the cast and crew in Sathyam Cinemas, Chennai.

The album opened to positive reviews from critics. Behindwoods gave 2.75 out of 5 to the soundtrack, stating, "Iraivi stays true to the riveting combination of Santosh Narayanan and Karthik Subburaj with some quirkiest songs of the season!" Sify gave 3.5 out of 5 to the album and stated "Santhosh Narayanan is back in style!". Indiaglitz stated that the album is "wholesomely innovative" giving a 3.5 out of 5 stars. Karthik Srinivasan of Milliblog wrote "Less album-friendly (perhaps more situational) soundtrack from Santhosh."

Release 
Karthik Subbaraj announced that the first look and teaser will be released during the occasion of Diwali (10 November 2015) and the film will be scheduled for Christmas release (25 December 2015). However, post-production delays prompted the team to postpone the release to the first quarter of 2016. On 20 January 2016, the first look poster along with the teaser released through social media to positive response from viewers.

During February 2016, a source reported that the film will be released theatrically on 25 March 2016. However, the producer refuted such claims citing the release of Vijay Sethupathi's other two films Sethupathi and Kadhalum Kadanthu Pogum on the same month. The film's trailer was released at the audio launch event held on 15 April 2016, where the makers announced a new release date of 20 May 2016. Due to the release of other big-budget films and also the Tamil Nadu legislative assembly elections being held during the month, the team pushed the release to 3 June 2016. The same was announced on 9 May 2016.

The Tamil Nadu theatrical rights of the film were sold to KR Films and Skylark Movies, whereas the Chennai city theatrical rights were acquired by Jazz Cinemas. The satellite rights of the film were sold to Jaya TV. As a part of the promotional campaign, the making of the film will be premiered as a four-episode web series, starting from 22 May 2016. The producers also collaborated with The Sight Media, to launch an in-auto LED branding, with the clips and video promos of the film being available for customers traveling in Chennai autos through the LED panels installed there.

Reception 
The film opened to positive response from critics. M. Suganth of The Times of India gave 3.5 out of 5 and stated "Karthik's writing is novelistic, with each character having their own well-sketched arcs." In his review for The Hindu, Baradwaj Rangan wrote " Iraivi is an unusual feminist film, in the sense that it's seen entirely through the prism of sympathetic male characters. This is bound to happen when there are so many people, so many strands, when we don't follow one person's simplistic “you go, girl” journey. But when the parts are so well-crafted, we don't complain as much about their sum not adding up to a satisfying whole." Gauthaman Baskaran of Hindustan Times wrote "Iraivi in the end seems like a story gone astray, the lives of several people destroyed by male egoistic rage that seeks solution in blood and gore. There is very little to cheer in the 160-minute work, which, though has some interesting performances by Simha, Surya and Anjali." Kirubakar Purushothaman of India Today gave 3 out of 5 and stated "The story of Iraivi is about the victimisation of the females in the film by the malevolent arrogance of their respective not-so-better halves." Indiaglitz gave a rating of 3.5 out of 5 stating "A hard hitting film that has power packed performances from the top notch lead cast that is worth the watch." Behindwoods gave 2.75 out of 5 stating "Iraivi has something profound that is best felt than explained. With just good intentions, a film won't grow up to be a product that a filmmaker wishes; Support from the performers and the technicians is a mandate and Karthik has enjoyed the luxury of having it."

S. Saraswathi of Rediff.com gave 3.5 out of 5 to the film stating that "The beautifully etched out characters, the performances, the exceptional music and the thought-provoking message makes Karthik Subbaraj's Iraivi a must watch." Giving 3 out of 5 stars, Anupama Subramanian of Deccan Chronicle wrote "The movie has a feminist theme and the bold characters have semblance to one we used to see in K. Balachander's films." Vikram Venkateshwaran of The Quint wrote "Iraivi disturbingly tells you that gender is not based on one's plumbing. All of the characters, including the women who are victimised, only seek happiness for themselves. And that's what makes it so real and relatable." Sowmya Rajendran of The News Minute reviewed "Subbaraj does suggest that women ought to stop depending on men for their happiness but sadly, even then, none of his female characters MAKE that choice actively. The men do it on their behalf. The women are like characters from Waiting for Godot, hoping that someday, things will get better without taking charge of their own lives. This is a very simplistic depiction and does injustice to both genders. It is also unreal though we may be tricked into believing that it is completely realistic."

Controversies 
The film featured a character of an egoistic film producer played by Vijay Murugan, who is shown as ruthless, money-minded person who does not care about the feelings of a struggling director (played by SJ Suryah). Post-release, few members of Tamil Film Producers Council including P. L. Thenappan criticised Subbaraj for allegedly portraying the producer's character in poor light and also threatened to issue a "red card" against the director. K. E. Gnanavel Raja, who co-produced and distributed the film also expressed his disappointment against the issue. Many reports claimed that Subbaraj's fallout with film producer Kathiresan during the production of Jigarthanda (2014) is the reason why he portrayed the character in poor light. After Subbaraj issued a letter to the Tami Film Directors Union explaining his position, the problem was amicably resolved.

Impact 
Inspired by the film, a showroom named Iraivi was organised by Vijay Sethupathi's sister in Chennai.

References

External links
 

Films scored by Santhosh Narayanan
2016 films
Indian drama films
Indian feminist films
2010s Tamil-language films
Films about alcoholism
Indian pregnancy films
Films set in prison
Films about domestic violence
Films about dysfunctional families
Films about women in India
Films directed by Karthik Subbaraj